Jibanananda Das (17 February 1899 – 22 October 1954) was an Indian poet, writer, novelist and essayist in the Bengali language. Popularly called "Rupashi Banglar Kabi'' ('Poet of Beautiful Bengal'), Das is the most read poet after Rabindranath Tagore and Kazi Nazrul Islam in Bangladesh and West Bengal. While not particularly well recognised during his lifetime, today Das is acknowledged as one of the greatest poets in the Bengali language.

Born in Barisal to a Vaidya-Brahmo family, Das studied English literature at Presidency College, Kolkata and earned his MA from Calcutta University. He had a troubling career and suffered financial hardship throughout his life. He taught at many colleges but was never granted tenure. He settled in Kolkata after the partition of India. Das died on 22 October 1954, eight days after being hit by a tramcar. The witnesses said that though the tramcar whistled, he did not stop, and got struck. Some deem the accident as an attempt at suicide.

Das was very underrated poet in his time; he wrote profusely, but as he was a recluse and introvert, he did not publish most of his writings during his lifetime. Most of his work were hidden, and only seven volumes of his poems were published. After his death, it was discovered that apart from poems, Das wrote 21 novels and 108 short stories. His notable works include Ruposhi Bangla, Banalata Sen, Mahaprithibi, Shreshtha Kavita. Das's early poems exhibit the influence of Kazi Nazrul Islam, but in the latter half of the 20th century, Das's influence became one of the major catalysts in the making of Bengali poetry.

Das received Rabindra-Memorial Award for Banalata Sen in 1953 at All Bengal Rabindra Literature Convention. Das's Shrestha Kavita won the Sahitya Academy Award in 1955. A film inspired by Das's short story Jamrultola, named 'Sunder Jibon' directed by Sandeep Chattopadhyay (Chatterjee), produced by Satyajit Ray Film And Television Institute won the National Film Award for Best Short Fiction Film at the 50th National Film Awards with Shantanu Bose in the lead.

Biography

Early life 

Jibanananda Das was born in 1899 in a Baidya family in the small district town of Barisal. His ancestors came from the Bikrampur (now Mushiganj) region of the Dhaka Division, from a now-extinct village called Gaupara in the kumarvog area of the Louhajang Upazila on the banks of the river Padma. Jibanananda's grandfather Sarbānanda Dāśagupta was the first to settle permanently in Barisal. He was an early exponent of the reformist Brahmo Samaj movement in Barisal and was highly regarded in town for his philanthropy. He erased the -gupta suffix from the family name, regarding it as a symbol of Vedic Brahmin excess, thus rendering the surname to Das. Jibanananda's father Satyānanda Dāś (1863–1942) was a schoolmaster,  essayist, magazine publisher, and
founder-editor of Brôhmobadi, a journal of the Brahmo Samaj dedicated to the exploration of social issues.

Jibanananda's mother Kusumakumārī Dāś (1875–1948) was a poet who wrote a famous poem called Adôrsho Chhēlē ("The Ideal Boy") whose refrain is well known to Bengalis to this day: Āmādēr dēshey hobey shei chhēlē kobey / Kothae nā boṛo hoye kajey boro hobey. (The child who achieves not in words but in deeds, when will this land know such a one?)

Jibanananda was the eldest son of his parents, and was called by the nickname Milu. A younger brother Aśōkānanda Dāś was born in 1901 and a sister called Shuchoritā in 1915. Milu fell violently ill in his childhood, and his parents feared for his life. Fervently desiring to restore his health, Kusumkumari took her ailing child on pilgrimage to Lucknow, Agra and Giridih. They were accompanied on these journeys by their uncle Chandranāth.

In January 1908, Milu, by now eight years old, was admitted to the first grade in Brojomohon School. The delay was due to his father's opposition to admitting children into school at too early an age. Milu's childhood education was therefore limited to his mother's tutelage.

His school life passed by relatively uneventfully. In 1915 he successfully completed his matriculation examination from Brajamohan College, obtaining a first division in the process. He repeated the feat two years later when he passed the intermediate exams from Brajamohan College. Evidently an accomplished student, he left his home at rural Barisal to join University of Calcutta.

Life in Calcutta: first phase 
Jibanananda enrolled in Presidency College, Kolkata. He studied English literature and graduated with a BA (Honours) degree in 1919. That same year, his first poem appeared in print in the Boishakh issue of Brahmobadi journal. Fittingly, the poem was called Borsho-abahon (Arrival of the New Year). This poem was published anonymously, with only the honorific Sri in the byline. However, the annual index in the year-end issue of the magazine revealed his full name: "Sri Jibanananda Das Gupta, BA".

In 1921, he completed the MA degree in English from University of Calcutta, obtaining a second class. He was also studying law. At this time, he lived in the Hardinge student quarters next to the university. Just before his exams, he fell ill with bacillary dysentery, which affected his preparation for the examination.

The following year, he started his teaching career. He joined the English department of City College, Calcutta as a tutor. By this time, he had left Hardinge and was boarding at Harrison Road. He gave up his law studies. It is thought that he also lived in a house in Bechu Chatterjee Street for some time with his brother Ashokanananda, who had come there from Barisal for his MSc studies.

Travels and travails 
His literary career was starting to take off. When Deshbondhu Chittaranjan Das died in June 1925, Jibanananda wrote a poem called 'Deshbandhu' Prayan'e' ("On the Death of the Friend of the nation") which was published in Bangabani magazine. This poem would later take its place in the collection called Jhara Palok (1927). On reading it, poet Kalidas Roy said that he had thought the poem was the work of a mature, accomplished poet hiding behind a pseudonym. Jibanananda's earliest printed prose work was also published in 1925. This was an obituary entitled "Kalimohan Das'er Sraddha-bashorey," which appeared in serialised form in Brahmobadi magazine. His poetry began to be widely published in various literary journals and little magazines in Calcutta, Dhaka and elsewhere. These included Kallol, perhaps the most famous literary magazine of the era, Kalikalam (Pen and Ink), Progoti (Progress) (co-edited by Buddhadeb Bose) and others. At this time, he occasionally used the surname Dasgupta as opposed to Das.

In 1927, Jhara Palok (Fallen Feathers), his first collection of poems, came out. A few months later, Jibanananda was fired from his job at the City College. The college had been struck by student unrest surrounding a religious festival, and enrolment seriously suffered  as a consequence. Still in his late 20s, Jibanananda was the youngest member of the faculty and therefore regarded as the most dispensable. In the literary circle of Calcutta, he also came under serial attack. One of the most serious literary critics of that time, Sajanikanta Das, began to write aggressive critiques of his poetry in the review pages of Shanibarer Chithi (the Saturday Letter) magazine.

With nothing to keep him in Calcutta, Jibanananda left for the small town of Bagerhat in the far south, there to resume his teaching career at Bagerhat P. C. College. But after about three months he returned to the big city, now in dire financial straits. To make ends meet, he gave private tuition to students while applying for full-time positions in academia. In December 1929, he moved to Delhi to take up a teaching post at Ramjas College; again this lasted no more than a few months. Back in Barisal, his family had been making arrangements for his marriage. Once Jibanananda went to Barisal, he failed to go back to Delhi – and, consequently, lost the job.

In May 1930, he married Labanyaprabhai Das, a girl whose ancestors came from Khulna. At the subsequent reception in Dhaka's Ram Mohan Library, leading literary lights of the day such as Ajit Kumar Dutta and Buddhadeb Bose were assembled. A daughter called Manjusree was born to the couple in February of the following year.

Around this time, he wrote one of his most controversial poems. "Camp'e" (At the Camp) was printed in Sudhindranath Dutta's Parichay magazine and immediately caused a firestorm in the literary circle of Calcutta. The poem's ostensible subject is a deer hunt on a moonlit night. Many accused Jibanananda of promoting indecency and incest through this poem. More and more, he turned now, in secrecy, to fiction. He wrote a number of short novels and short stories during this period of unemployment, strife and frustration.

In 1934 he wrote the series of poems that would form the basis of the collection called Rupasi Bangla. These poems were not discovered during his lifetime, and were only published in 1957, three years after his death.

Back in Barisal 
In 1935, Jibanananda, by now familiar with professional disappointment and poverty, returned to his alma mater Brajamohan College, which was then affiliated with the University of Calcutta. He joined as a lecturer in the English department. In Calcutta, Buddhadeb Bose, Premendra Mitra and Samar Sen were starting a brand new poetry magazine called Kobita. Jibanananda's work featured in the very first issue of the magazine, a poem called Mrittu'r Aagey (Before Death). Upon reading the magazine, Tagore wrote a lengthy letter to Bose and especially commended the Das poem: "Jibanananda Das' vivid, colourful poem has given me great pleasure." It was in the second issue of Kobita (Poush 1342 issue, Dec 1934/Jan 1935) that Jibanananda published his now-legendary "Banalata Sen". Today, this 18-line poem is among the most famous poems in the language.

The following year, his second volume of poetry Dhusar Pandulipi was published. Jibanananda was by now well settled in Barisal. A son Samarananda was born in November 1936. His impact in the world of Bengali literature continued to increase. In 1938, Tagore compiled a poetry anthology entitled Bangla Kabya Parichay (Introduction to Bengali Poetry) and included an abridged version of Mrityu'r Aagey, the same poem that had moved him three years ago. Another important anthology came out in 1939, edited by Abu Sayeed Ayub and Hirendranath Mukhopadhyay; Jibanananda was represented with four poems: Pakhira, Shakun, Banalata Sen, and Nagna Nirjan Haat.

In 1942, the same year that his father died, his third volume of poetry Banalata Sen was published under the aegis of Kobita Bhavan and Buddhadeb Bose. A ground-breaking modernist poet in his own right, Bose was a steadfast champion of Jibanananda's poetry, providing him with numerous platforms for publication. 1944 saw the publication of Maha Prithibi. The Second World War had a profound impact on Jibanananda's poetic vision. The following year, Jibanananda provided his own translations of several of his poems for an English anthology to be published under the title Modern Bengali Poems. Oddly enough, the editor Debiprasad Chattopadhyaya considered these translations to be sub-standard, and instead commissioned Martin Kirkman to translate four of Jibanananda's poems for the book.

Life in Calcutta: final phase 
The aftermath of the war saw heightened demands for Indian independence. Muslim politicians led by Jinnah wanted an independent homeland for the Muslims of the subcontinent. Bengal was uniquely vulnerable to partition: its western half was majority-Hindu, its eastern half majority-Muslim. Yet adherents of both religions spoke the same language, came from the same ethnic stock, and lived in close proximity to each other in town and village. Jibanananda had emphasized the need for communal harmony at an early stage. In his very first book Jhora Palok, he had included a poem called Hindu Musalman. In it he proclaimed:However, events in real life belied his beliefs. In the summer of 1946, he travelled to Calcutta from Barisal on three months' paid leave. He stayed at his brother Ashokananda's place through the bloody riots that swept the city. Violence broke out in Noakhali and Tippera districts later in the autumn, and he was unable to return to Barisal. Just before partition in August 1947, Jibanananda quit his job at Brajamohan College and said goodbye to his beloved Barisal. He and his family were among the 10 million refugees who took part in the largest cross-border migration in history. For a while he worked for a magazine called Swaraj as its Sunday editor. However, he left the job after a few months.

In 1948, he completed two of his novels, Mallyaban and Shutirtho, neither of which were discovered during his life. Shaat'ti Tarar Timir was published in December 1948. The same month, his mother Kusumkumari Das died in Calcutta.

By now, he was well established in the Calcutta literary world. He was appointed to the editorial board of yet another new literary magazine Dondo (Conflict). However, in a reprise of his early career, he was sacked from his job at Kharagpur College in February 1951. In 1952, Signet Press published Banalata Sen. The book received widespread acclaim and won the Book of the Year award from the All-Bengal Tagore Literary Conference. Later that year, the poet found another job at Barisha College (now known as Vivekananda College, Thakurpukur). This job too he lost within a few months. He applied afresh to Diamond Harbour Fakirchand College, but eventually declined it, owing to travel difficulties. Instead he was obliged to take up a post at Howrah Girl's College (now known as Bijoy Krishna Girls' College), a constituent affiliated undergraduate college of the University of Calcutta. As the head of the English department, he was entitled to a 50-taka monthly bonus on top of his salary.

By the last year of his life, Jibanananda was acclaimed as one of the best poets of the post-Tagore era. He was constantly in demand at literary conferences, poetry readings, radio recitals etc. In May 1954, he was published a volume titled 'Best Poems' (Sreshttho Kobita). His Best Poems won the Indian Sahitya Akademi Award in 1955.

Love and marriage 
Young Jibanananda fell in love with Shovona, daughter of his uncle Atulchandra Das, who lived in the neighbourhood. He dedicated his first anthology of poems to Shovona without mentioning her name explicitly. He did not try to marry her since marriage between cousins was not socially acceptable. She has been referred to as Y in his literary notes. Soon after marrying Labanyaprabha Das (née Gupta) in 1930, a personality clash erupted and Jibanananda Das gave up the hope of a happy married life. The gap with his wife never narrowed. While Jibanananda was near death after a tram accident on 14 October 1954, Labanyaprabha did not visit her husband on his deathbed more than once. At that time she was busy in film-making in Tallyganj.

Death 

Jibanananda’s life came to a sudden end by way of a road accident when he was only 55. On 14 October 1954, he was crossing a road near Calcutta's Deshapriya Park when he was hit by a tram. Jibanananda was returning home after his routine evening walk. At that time, he used to reside in a rented apartment on the Lansdowne Road. Seriously injured, he was taken to Shambhunath Pundit Hospital. Poet-writer Sajanikanta Das who had been one of his fiercest critics was tireless in his efforts to secure the best treatment for the poet. He even persuaded Dr. Bidhan Chandra Roy (then chief minister of West Bengal) to visit him in hospital. Nonetheless, the injury was too severe to redress. Jibanananda died in hospital on 22 October 1954 eight days later, at about midnight. He was then 55 and left behind his wife, Labanyaprabha Das, a son and a daughter, and the ever-growing band of readers.

His body was cremated the following day at Keoratola crematorium. Following popular belief, it has been alleged in some biographical accounts that his accident was actually an attempt at suicide.

The literary circle deeply mourned his death. Almost all the newspapers published obituaries which contained sincere appreciations of the poetry of Jibanananda. Poet Sanjay Bhattacharya wrote the death news and sent to different newspapers. On 1 November 1954, The Times of India wrote:

The premature death after an accident of Mr. Jibanananda Das removes from the field of Bengali literature a poet, who, though never in the limelight of publicity and prosperity, made a significant contribution to modern Bengali poetry by his prose-poems and free-verse. ...  A poet of nature with a serious awareness of the life around him Jibanananda Das was known not so much for the social content of his poetry as for his bold imagination and the concreteness of his image. To a literary world dazzled by Tagore's glory, Das showed how to remain true to the poet's vocation without basking in its reflection."
In his obituary in the Shanibarer Chithi, Sajanikanta Das quoted the poet:
When one day I'll leave this body once for all −
Shall I never return to this world any more?
Let me come back
On a winter night
To the bedside of any dying acquaintance
With a cold pale lump of orange in hand.

Jibanananda and Bengali poetry

Influence of Tagore 
As of 2009, Bengali is the mother tongue of more than 300 million people living mainly in Bangladesh and India. Bengali poetry of the modern age flourished on the elaborate foundation laid by Michael Madhusudan Dutt (1824–1873) and Rabindranath Tagore (1861–1941). Tagore ruled over the domain of Bengali poetry and literature for almost half a century, inescapably influencing contemporary poets. Bengali literature caught the attention of the international literary world when Tagore was awarded the 1913 Nobel Prize in Literature for Gitanjali, an anthology of poems rendered into English by the poet himself with the title Song Offering. Since then Bengali poetry has travelled a long way.

It has evolved around its own tradition; it has responded to the poetry movements around the world; it has assumed various dimensions in different tones, colours and essence.

Contemporaries of Jibanananda 
In Bengal, efforts to break out of the Tagorian worldview and stylistics started in the early days of the 20th century. Poet Kazi Nazrul Islam (1899–1976) popularised himself on a wide scale with patriotic themes and musical tone and tenor. However, a number of new -ration poets consciously attempted to align Bengali poetry with the essence of worldwide emergent modernism, starting towards the end of the 19th century and attributeable to contemporary European and American trends. Five poets who are particularly acclaimed for their contribution in creating a post-Tagorian poetic paradigm and infusing modernism in Bengali poetry are Sudhindranath Dutta (1901–1960), Buddhadeb Bose (1908–1974), Amiya Chakravarty (1901–1986), Jibanananda Das (1899–1954) and Bishnu Dey (1909–1982). The contour of modernism in 20th-century Bengali poetry was drawn by these five pioneers and some of their contemporaries.

However, not all of them have survived the test of time. Of them, poet Jibanananda Das was little understood during his lifetime. In fact, he received scanty attention and some considered him incomprehensible. Readers, including his contemporary literary critics, also alleged faults in his style and diction. On occasions, he faced merciless criticism from leading literary personalities of his time. Even Tagore made unkind remarks on his diction, although he praised his poetic capability. Nevertheless, destiny reserved a crown for him.

Growth of popularity 
During the later half of the twentieth century, Jibanananda Das emerged as one of the most popular poets of modern Bengali literature. Popularity apart, Jibanananda Das had distinguished himself as an extraordinary poet presenting a paradigm hitherto unknown. Whilst his unfamiliar poetic diction, choice of words and thematic preferences took time to reach the hearts of readers, by the end of the 20th century the poetry of Jibanananda had become a defining essence of modernism in 20th-century Bengali poetry.

Whilst his early poems bear the undoubted influence of Kazi Nazrul Islam and other poets like Satyendranath Dutta, before long Jibananda had thoroughly overcame these influences and created a new poetic diction. Buddhadeb Bose was among the first to recognise his style and thematic novelty. However, as his style and diction matured, his message appeared obscured. Readers, including critics, started to complain about readability and question his sensibility.

Only after his accidental death in 1954 did a readership emerge that not only was comfortable with Jibanananda's style and diction but also enjoyed his poetry. Questions about the obscurity of his poetic message were no longer raised. By the time his birth centenary was celebrated in 1999, Jibanananda Das was the most popular and well-read poet of Bengali literature. Even when the last quarter of the 20th century ushered in the post-modern era, Jibanananda Das continued to be relevant to the new taste and fervour. This was possible because his poetry underwent many cycles of change, and later poems contain post-modern elements.

Poetics 
Jibanananda Das started writing and publishing in his early 20s. During his lifetime he published only 269 poems in different journals and magazines, of which 162 were collected in seven anthologies, from Jhara Palak to Bela Obela Kalbela. Many of his poems have been published posthumously at the initiative of his brother Asokananda Das, sister Sucharita Das and nephew Amitananda Das, and the efforts of Dr. Bhumendra Guha, who over the decades copied them from scattered manuscripts. By 2008, the total count of Jibananda's known poems stood at almost 800. In addition, numerous novels and short stories were discovered and published about the same time.

Jibanananda scholar Clinton B. Seely has termed Jibanananda Das as "Bengal's most cherished poet since Rabindranath Tagore". On the other hand, to many, reading the poetry of Jibanananda Das is like stumbling upon a labyrinth of the mind similar to what one imagines Camus's 'absurd' man toiling through. Indeed, Jibanananda Das's poetry is sometimes an outcome of profound feeling painted in imagery of a type not readily understandable. Sometimes the connection between the sequential lines is not obvious. In fact, Jibanananda Das broke the traditional circular structure of poetry (introduction-middle-end) and the pattern of logical sequence of words, lines and stanzas. Consequently, the thematic connotation is often hidden under a rhythmic narrative that requires careful reading between the lines. The following excerpt will bear the point out:

Lepers open the hydrant and lap some water.
Or maybe that hydrant was already broken.
Now at midnight they descend upon the city in droves,
Scattering sloshing petrol. Though ever careful,
Someone seems to have taken a serious spill in the water.
Three rickshaws trot off, fading into the last gaslight.
I turn off, leave Phear Lane, defiantly
Walk for miles, stop beside a wall
On Bentinck Street, at Territti Bazar,
There in the air dry as roasted peanuts.
(Night – a poem on night in Calcutta, translated by Clinton B. Seely)
Though Jibanananda Das was variously branded at times and was popularly known as a modernist of the Yeatsian-Poundian-Eliotesque school, Annadashankar Roy called him the truest poet. Jibanananda Das conceived a poem and moulded it up in the way most natural for him. When a theme occurred to him, he shaped it with words, metaphors and imagery that distinguished him from all others. Jibanananda Das's poetry is to be felt, rather than merely read or heard.

Writing about Jibanananda Das' poetry, Joe Winter remarked:It is a natural process, though perhaps the rarest one. Jibanananda Das's style reminds us of this, seeming to come unbidden. It has many sentences that scarcely pause for breath, of word-combinations that seem altogether unlikely but work, of switches in register from sophisticated usage to a village-dialect word, that jar and in the same instant settle in the mind, full of friction – in short, that almost becomes a part of the consciousness ticking.

A few lines are quoted below in support of Winter's remarks:

Nevertheless, the owl stays wide awake;
The rotten, still frog begs two more moments
 in the hope of another dawn in conceivable warmth.
We feel in the deep tracelessness of flocking darkness
 the unforgiving enmity of the mosquito-net all around;
The mosquito loves the stream of life,
 awake in its monastery of darkness.
(One day eight years ago, translated by Faizul Latif Chowdhury)

Or elsewhere:

... how the wheel of justice is set in motion 
        by a smidgen of wind -
or if someone dies and someone else gives him a bottle
of medicine, free – then who has the profit? -
over all of this the four have a mighty word-battle.
For the land they will go to now is called the soaring river
where a wretched bone-picker and his bone
        come and discover
their faces in water – till looking at faces is over. 
(Idle Moment, translated by Joe Winter)

Also noteworthy are his sonnets, the most famous being seven untitled pieces collected in the publication Shaat-ti Tarar Timir ("The Blackness of Seven Stars), where he describes, on one hand, his attachment to his motherland, and on the other, his views about life and death in general. They are noteworthy not only because of the picturesque description of nature that was a regular feature of most of his work but also for the use of metaphors and allegories. For example, a lone owl flying about in the night sky is taken as an omen of death, while the anklets on the feet of a swan symbolises the vivacity of life. The following are undoubtedly the most oft-quoted line from this collection:

 বাংলার মুখ আমি দেখিয়াছি, তাই আমি পৃথিবীর রূপ খুঁজিতে যাই না আর...

Jibanananda successfully integrated Bengali poetry with the slightly older Eurocentric international modernist movement of the early 20th century. In this regard he possibly owes as much to his exotic exposure as to his innate poetic talent. Although hardly appreciated during his lifetime, many critics believe that his modernism, evoking almost all the suggested elements of the phenomenon, remains untranscended to date, despite the emergence of many notable poets during the last 50 years. His success as a modern Bengali poet may be attributed to the facts that Jibanananda Das in his poetry not only discovered the tract of the slowly evolving 20th-century modern mind, sensitive and reactive, full of anxiety and tension, bu that he invented his own diction, rhythm and vocabulary, with an unmistakably indigenous rooting, and that he maintained a self-styled lyricism and imagism mixed with an extraordinary existentialist sensuousness, perfectly suited to the modern temperament in the Indian context, whereby he also averted fatal dehumanisation that could have alienated him from the people. He was at once a classicist and a romantic and created an appealing world hitherto unknown:

For thousands of years I roamed the paths of this earth,
From waters round Ceylon in dead of night
        to Malayan seas.
Much have I wandered. I was there 
in the grey world of Asoka
And Bimbisara, pressed on through darkness
        to the city of Vidarbha.
I am a weary heart surrounded by life's frothy ocean.
To me she gave a moment's peace – 
        Banalata Sen from Natore.
(Banalata Sen)

While reading Jibanananda Das, one often encounters references to olden times and places, events and personalities. A sense of time and history is an unmistakable element that has shaped Jibanananda Das's poetic world to a great extent. However, he lost sight of nothing surrounding him. Unlike many of his peers who blindly imitated the renowned western poets in a bid to create a new poetic domain and generated spurious poetry, Jibanananda Das remained anchored in his own soil and time, successfully assimilating experiences real and virtual and producing hundreds of unforgettable lines. His intellectual vision was thoroughly embedded in Bengal's nature and beauty:

Amidst a vast meadow the last time when I met her
I said: 'Come again a time like this
if one day you so wish
twenty-five years later.'
This been said, I came back home.
After that, many a time, the moon and the stars
from field to field have died, the owls and the rats
searching grains in paddy fields on a moonlit night
fluttered and crept! – shut eyed
many times left and right
        have slept
several souls! – awake kept I
all alone – the stars on the sky 
        travel fast
faster still, time speeds by.
        Yet it seems
Twenty-five years will forever last.
(After Twenty-five Years, translated by Luna Rushdi)

Thematically, Jibanananda Das is amazed by the continued existence of humankind in the backdrop of eternal flux of time,  wherein individual presence is insignificant and meteoric albeit inescapable. He feels that we are closed in, fouled by the numbness of this concentration cell (Meditations). To him, the world is weird and olden, and as a race, mankind has been a persistent "wanderer of this world" (Banalata Sen) that, according to him, has existed too long to know anything more (Before death, Walking alone) or experience anything fresh. The justification of further mechanical existence like Mahin's horses (The Horses) is apparently absent: "So (he) had slept by the Dhanshiri river on a cold December night, and had never thought of waking again" (Darkness).

As an individual, tired of life and yearning for sleep (One day eight years ago), Jibanananda Das is certain that peace can be found nowhere and that it is useless to move to a distant land, since there is no way of freedom from sorrows fixed by life (Land, Time and Offspring). Nevertheless, he suggests: "O sailor, you press on, keep pace with the sun!" (Sailor).

Why did Jibanananda task himself to forge a new poetic speech, while others in his time preferred to tread the usual path? The answer is simple. In his endeavours to shape a world of his own, he was gradual and steady. He was an inward-looking person and was not in a hurry.

I do not want to go anywhere so fast.
Whatever my life wants I have time to reach
        there walking 
(Of 1934 – a poem on the motor car, translated by Golam Mustafa)

In the poet's birth centenary, Bibhav published 40 of his poems that had been yet unpublished.
Shamik Bose has translated a poem, untitled by the poet. Here is the Bengali original, with Bose's translation in English:

ঘুমায়ে পড়িতে হবে একদিন আকাশের নক্ষত্রের তলে
শ্রান্ত হয়ে-- উত্তর মেরুর সাদা তুষারের সিন্ধুর মতন!
এই রাত্রি,--- এই দিন,--- এই আলো,--- জীবনের এই আয়োজন,---
আকাশের নিচে এসে ভুলে যাব ইহাদের আমরা সকলে!
একদিন শরীরের স্বাদ আমি জানিয়াছি, সাগরের জলে
দেহ ধুয়ে;--- ভালোবেসে ভিজইয়েছি আমাদের হৃদয় কেমন!
একদিন জেগে থেকে দেখিয়েছি আমাদের জীবনের এই আলোড়ন,
আঁধারের কানে আলো--- রাত্রি দিনের কানে কানে কত কথা বলে
শুনিয়াছি;--- এই দেখা--- জেগে থাকা একদিন তবু সাংগ হবে,---

মাঠের শস্যের মত আমাদের ফলিবার রহিয়াছে সময়;
একবার ফলে গেলে তারপর ভাল লাগে মরণের হাত,---
ঘুমন্তের মত করে আমাদের কখন সে বুকে তুলে লবে!---
সেই মৃত্যু কাছে এসে একে একে সকলেরে বুকে তুলে লয়;---
সময় ফুরায়ে গেলে সব চেয়ে ভাল লাগে তাহার আস্বাদ!---

Under this sky, these stars beneath --
One day will have to sleep inside tiredness --
Like snow-filled white ocean of North Pole! –

This night – this day – O this light as bright as it may! --
These designs for a life – will forget all --
Under such a silent, fathomless sky!  –

Had felt the fragrance of a body one day, --
By washing my body inside sea water  --
Felt our heart so deep by falling in love! --
This vigor of life had seen one day awaken  – 
Light stoking the edge of darkness --
Have heard the passionate whispers of a night – always for a day! –

This visit! This conscious vigil that I see, I feel --
Yet will end one day --
Time only remains for us to ripe like a harvest in green soil --
Once so ripen, then the hands of death will be likeable – 
Will hold us in his chest, one by one --
Like a sleeplorn --
Fugitive lovelorn --
Inside tender whispers! –

When that time will prosper to an end and he will come --
That savor will be ... the most relishing.

Much literary evaluation of his poetry has been produced since Jibanananda Das's untimely death, beginning with the ten-page Introduction of Naked Lonely Hand, an anthology of 50 of the poet's poems rendered into English. Winter appears to have caught the essence of the poet, who appeared to be subtle, mysterious and bizarre even to native readers and critics of his time. He was also known as a surrealist poet for his spontaneous, frenzied overflow of subconscious mind in poetry and especially in diction.

Prose style 
During his lifetime Jibanananda remained solely a poet who occasionally wrote literary articles, mostly on request. Only after his death were a huge number of novels and short stories discovered. Thematically, Jibanananda's storylines are largely autobiographical. His own time constitutes the perspective. While in poetry he subdued his own life, he allowed it to be brought into his fiction. Structurally his fictional works are based more on dialogues than description by the author. However, his prose shows a unique style of compound sentences, use of non-colloquial words and a typical pattern of punctuation. His essays evidence a heavy prose style, which although complex, is capable of expressing complicated analytical statements. As a result, his prose was very compact, containing profound messages in a relatively short space.

Major works

Poetry 
 Jhôra Palok (Fallen Feathers), 1927.
 Dhushor Pandulipi (Grey Manuscript), 1936.
 Banalata Sen, 1942.
 Môhaprithibi (Great Universe), 1944.

 Shaat-ti Tarar Timir, (Darkness of Seven Stars), 1948.
 Shreshtho Kobita, (Best Poems), 1954: Navana, Calcutta.
 Rupasi Bangla (Bengal, the Beautiful), written in 1934, published posthumously in 1957.
 Bela Obela Kalbela (Times, Bad Times, End Times), 1961, published posthumously but the manuscript was prepared during lifetime.
 Sudorshona(The beautiful), published posthumously in 1973: Sahitya Sadan, Calcutta.
 Alo Prithibi (The World of Light), published posthumously in 1981: Granthalaya Private Ltd., Calcutta.
 Manobihangam (The Bird that is my Heart), published posthumously in 1979: Bengal Publishers Private Ltd. Calcutta.
 Oprkashitô Ekanno (Unpublished Fifty-one), published posthumously in 1999, Mawla Brothers, Dhaka.
 Krishna Dasami, Pathak Samabesh, Dhaka. published posthumously in 2015.
 Surya Osuryaloke, Suchoyoni, Dhaka. published posthumously in 2021.

Novels 
 Malyabaan (novel), New Script, Calcutta, 1973
 Bashmatir Upakhyan
 Bibhav
 Biraaj
 Chaarjon
 Jiban-Pronali
 Kalyani
 Karu-Bashona
 Mrinal
 Nirupam Yatra
 Pretinir rupkatha
 Purnima
 Sutirtha
  joyoti

Short stories 
 Pogi Ako
 Aekgheye Jibon
 Akankha-Kamonar Bilas
 Basor Sojyar pase
 Bibahito Jibon
 Bilas
 Boi
 Britter moto
 Chakri Nei
 Chayanot
 Hater Tas
 Hiseb-nikes
 Jadur Desh
 Jamrultola
 Kinnorlok
 Kotha sudhu Kotha, Kotha, Kotha
 Kuashar Vitor Mrityur Somoy
 Ma hoyar kono Saadh
 Mangser Kanti
 Meyemanuser Ghrane
 Meyemnus
 Mohisher Shingh
 Nakoler Khelae
 Nirupam Jatra
 Paliye Jete
 Premik Swami
 Prithibita Sishuder Noy
 Purnima
 Raktomangsohin
 Sadharon Manus
 Sango, Nisongo
 Sari
 Sheetrater Andhokare
 Somnath o Shrimoti
 Taajer Chobi
 Upekkhar Sheet

Non-fiction 
 "Aat Bachor Ager Din" prosonge
 Adhunik Kobita
 Amar Baba
 Amar Ma
 Asomapto Alochona
 Bangla Bhasa o Sahittyer Bhobshiyot
 Bangla Kobitar Bhobishyot
 "Camp"-e
 Desh kal o kobita
 "Dhusor Pandulipi" prosonge
 Ekti Aprokashito Kobita
 Ektukhani
 Jukti Jiggasha o Bangali
 Keno Likhi
 Ki hisebe Saswato
 Kobita o Konkaboti
 Kobita Prosonge
 Kobitaar Kôtha (tr. On Poetry), Signet Press, Calcutta, 1362 (Bengali year)
 Kobitapath
 Kobitar Alochona
 Kobitar Atma o Sorir
 Lekhar Kotha
 Matrachetona
 Nazrul Islam
 Prithibi o Somoy
 Rabindranath o Adhunik Bangla Kobita
 Rasoranjan Sen
 Ruchi, Bichar o Onnanyo kotha
 Saratchandra
 Sikkha-Dikkha
 Sikkha, Dikkha Sikkhokota
 Sikkha o Ingrezi
 Sikkhar Kotha
 Sottendranath Dutt
 Sottyo Biswas o Kobita
 Swapno kamona'r bhumika
 Sworgiyo Kalimohon Daser sradhobasore
 Uttoroibik Banglakabbyo

English essays
 Doctor Faustus: Thomas Mann
 Gioconda Smile: Aldous Huxley
 Journal: Gide
 The Bengali novel today
 The Bengali Poetry today
 Three Voices of Poetry: T. S. Eliot

Major collected texts 
 Bandopdhaya, Deviprasad : Kabya Songroho − Jibanananda Das (tr. Collection of Poetry of Jibanananda Das), 1993, Bharbi, 13/1 Bankim Chatterjje Street, Kolkata-73.
 Bandopdhaya, Deviprasad : Kabya Songroho − Jibanananda Das (tr. Collection of Poetry of Jibanananda Das), 1999, Gatidhara, 38/2-KA Bangla Bazaar, Dhaka-1100, Bangladesh.
 Bandopdhaya, Deviprasad : Jibanananda Das Uttorparba (1954–1965),  2000, Pustak Bipani, Calcutta.
 Chowdhury, Faizul Latif (editor) (1990), Jibanananda Das'er Prôbôndha Sômôgrô, (tr: Complete non-fictional prose works of Jibanananda Das), First edition : Desh Prokashon, Dhaka.
 Chowdhury, Faizul Latif (editor) (1995), Jibanananda Das'er Prôbôndha Sômôgrô, (tr: Complete non-fictional prose works of Jibanananda Das), Second edition : Mawla Brothers, Dhaka.
 Chowdhury, F. L. (ed) : Oprokashito 51 (tr. Unpublished fifty one poems of Jibanananda Das), 1999, Mawla Brothers, Dhaka.
 Shahriar, Abu Hasan : Jibanananda Das-er Gronthito-Ogronthito Kabita Samagra, 2004, Agaami Prokashoni, Dhaka.

Jibanananda in English translation 
Translating Jibanananda Das (JD) poses a real challenge to any translator. It not only requires translation of words and phrases, it demands 'translation' of colour and music, of imagination and images. Translations are a works of interpretation and reconstruction. When it comes to JD, both are quite difficult. However people have shown enormous enthusiasm in translating JD. Translation of JD commenced as the poet himself rendered some of his poetry into English at the request of poet Buddhadeb Bose for the Kavita. That was 1952. His translations include Banalata Sen, Meditations, Darkness, Cat and Sailor among others, many of which are now lost. Since then many JD lovers have taken interest in translating JD's poetry into English. These have been published, home and abroad, in different anthologies and magazines.

Obviously different translators have approached their task from different perspectives. Some intended to merely transliterate the poem while others wanted to maintain the characteristic tone of Jibanananda as much as possible. As indicated above, the latter is not an easy task. In this connection, it is interesting to quote Chidananda Dasgupta who informed of his experience in translating JD:
Effort has of course been made to see that the original's obliqueness or deliberate suppression of logical and syntactical links are not removed altogether. Sometimes Jibanananda's very complicated and apparently arbitrary syntax has been smoothed out to a clear flow. On occasion, a word or even a line has been dropped, and its intention incorporated somewhere just before or after. Names of trees, plants, places or other elements incomprehensible in English have often been reduced or eliminated for fear that they should become an unpleasant burden on the poem when read in translation.

Small wonder that Chidananda Dasgupta took quite a bit of liberty in his project of translating JD.

Major books containing poems of Jibanananda in English translation, as of 2008, are given below:
 Ahmed, Mushtaque : 'Gleanings from Jibanananda Das', 2002, Cox's Bazar Shaitya Academy, Cox's Bazar, Bangladesh
 Alam, Fakrul : 'Jibanananda Das – Selected poems with an Introduction, Chronology, and Glossary', 1999, University Press Limited, Dhaka
 Banerji, Anupam : 'Poems : Bengal the Beautiful and Banalata Sen by Jivanananda Das', (Translated and Illustrated by Anupam Banerji), 1999, North Waterloo Academic Press, 482 Lexington Crescent, Waterloo, Ontario, N2K 2J8, 519-742-2247
 Chaudhuri, Sukanta (ed): 'A Certain Sense – Poems by Jibanananda Das', Translated by Various Hands, 1998, Sahitya Akademi, Kolkata
 Chowdhury, F. L. (ed) : 'I have seen the Bengal's face – Poems from Jibanananda Das' (An anthology of poems from Jibanananda Das translated in English), 1995, Creative Workshop, Chittagong, Bangladesh
 Chowdhury, F. L. and G. Mustafa (ed) : 'Beyond Land and Time' (An anthology of one hundred selected poems of Jibanananda Das, translated into English), 2008, Somoy Prokashan, Dhaka, Bangladesh
 Dashgupta, Chidananda : 'Selected Poems – Jibanananda Das', 2006, Penguin Books, New Delhi.
 Gangopadhyay, Satya : Poems of Jibanananda Das, 1999, Chhatagali, Chinsurah, West Bengal, India
 Seely, Clinton B. : 'A Poet Apart' (A comprehensive literary biography of Jibanananda Das), 1990, Associated University Press Ltd, USA
 Seely, Clinton B. : 'Scent of Sun' (An anthology of poems of Jibanananda Das in English translation),  2008, — upcoming
 Winter, Joe : 'Bengal the Beautiful', 2006, Anvil Press Poetry Ltd., Neptune House, 70 Royal Hill, London SE10 8RF, UK
 Winter, Joe : 'Jibanananda Das – Naked Lonely Hand' (Selected poems : translated from Bengali), 2003, Anvil Press Poetry Ltd., London, UK
 Bholanath Das:  'Borrowed Light', (translation of Banalata Sen,1970 , Das Publishers, Hooghly, West Bengal, India)

Legacy of Jibanananda

Tribute 
" After Rabindranath, Jibanananda was the creator of a new kind of modernity in Bengali poetry. He gave birth to a completely new kind of language. In this context all of his anthologies are important. But, I like most 'Dhusar Pandulipi', 'Rupasi Bangla', 'Bela Abela Kalbela'...all of them are good. Actually in good poetry, the mind is transformed...Actually, the life of poet cohabits both solitude and ambition. So was Jibananda's...it is difficult to defy and condradict the revered poets of the world. Jibananda, is one such revered poets."—Binoy Majumdar.

" In the Post-Tagore era, Jibanananda was the most successful in creating a ring of poetry of uniqueness." – Buddhadeb Bhattacharjee

" Whenever I started reading Jibanananda, I found known poems in a new light." – Joy Goswami.

" Death has never been a unidimensional concept in Jibanananda's poetry. It has multiple meanings, multiple scopes."—Pabitra Sarkar.

" Pure and layered symbol is the speciality of Jibanananda's poetry. By exploring the unnamed expressions of the poetry, readers get bewitched into the symbols, images."—Dilip Jhaveri

" Postmodernism in Bengali poetry started with Jibanananda Das's poem Paradigm. " Malay Roy Choudhury

Quotation 

" Calcutta, with all its blemishes and bad names, is, after all, even in its odd architectural medley not so graceless as many strangers and Indians are disposed to think of it."

" Despite important differences, Calcutta seemed as its intricate map of body and mind would be laid open to bear a rather near resemblance to Paris."

" A mature artist...does not propose to evade the riddles around him. He takes stock of the significant directions and the purposes of his age and of their more clear and concrete embodiments in the men of his age. He arrives at his own philosophy and builds his own world, which is never a negation of the actual one, but is the same living world organized more truly and proportionately by the special reading of it by the special poet."

" Garnered so much of experience when I reached Calucutta; got several possibilities regarding literary, trade etc."

" There were so many myths regarding my elder brother. He escaped from life. He could not tolerate human company. He was solitary. Away from the all hustle-bustle...may be most of them have already proved wrong."—Sucahrita Das on her elder brother, the poet.

" Among our modernist poets, Jibanananda is the most solitary, most independent."—Buddhadeb Basu

Books on Jibanananda 
 (1965) 'Ekti Nakkhatro Ase', Ambuj Basu, Mousumi.
 (1970) 'Kobi Jibanananda Das', Sanjay Bhattacharya, Varbi.
 (1971) 'Jibanananda (ek khando)', Gopal Chandra Roy, Sahittya Sadan;
 'Manus Jibanananda', Labanya Das, Bengal Publishers;
 'Jibanananda Smriti', Debkumar Basu edited, Karuna Prokasani.
 (1972) 'Suddhatamo Kobi', Abdul Mannan Saiyad, Knowledge Home, Dhaka; 'Rupasi Banglar Kobi Jibanananda', Bijan Kanti Sarkar, Bijoy Sahitya Mandir; 'Rupasi Banglar Kobi Jibanananda', Shaymapada Sarkar, Kamini Prokasan.
 (1973) 'Jibanananda das', edited by Birendra Bhattacharya, Onnisto.
 (1975) 'Kobi Jibanananda', Suddhaswatto Basu, Sankha Prokasan.
 (1976) 'Jibanishilpi Jibanananda Das', Asadujjan, Bangladesh Book Corporation, Dhaka.
 (1979) 'Rupasi Banglar Kobi Jibanananda', Bijan Kanti Sarkar, Bijoy Sahitya Mandir; 'Rupasi Banglar Kobi Jibanananda', Shyamapada Sarkar, Kamini Prokashan.
 (1980) 'Rupasi Banglar Dui Kobi', Purnendu Patri, Ananda Publishers Ltd.
 (1983) 'Kacher Manus Jibanananda', Ajit Ghose, Bijoy Krishna Girls’ College Cheap Store;'Rabindranath Najrul Jibanananda ebong aekjon Probasi Bangali', Kalyan Kumar Basu, Biswagaen;'Adhunikata, Jibanananda o Porabastob', Tapodhir Bhattacharya and Swapna Bhattacharya, Nobark;'Jibananander Chetona Jagot', Pradumno Mitra, Sahityshri;'Jibanananda Das:Jiboniponji o Granthoponji', Provat Kumar Das, Hardo;'Prosongo:Jibanananda', Shibaji Bandopadhaya, Ayon.
 (1984) 'Jibanananda', Amalendu Basu, Banishilpo,;'Uttor Probesh', Susnato Jana;'Jibanananda', edited by Abdul Manna Sayad, Charitra, Dhaka;'Jibanananda Prasongiki', Sandip Datta, Hardo,
 (1985) 'Ami sei Purohit', Sucheta Mitra, A.Mukherji and Co;'Probondhokar Jibananada', Subrata Rudro, Nath Publishing;'Jibanananda Jiggasa', edited by Tarun Mukhopadhaya, pustok Biponi.
 (2003) 'Jibananda : Kabitar Mukhamukhi', Narayan Haldar.
 (2005) 'Amar Jibanananda', Dr. Himabanta Bondopadhyay, Bangiya Sahitya Samsad.
 (2008) 'Essays on Jibanananda Das', edited by Chowdhury F. L., Pathak Samabesh, Dhaka.
 (2009) 'Etodin Kothay Chilen', Anisul Hoque.
 (2014) 'Jibananander Andhokaare', Rajib Sinha, Ubudash, Kolkata-12.
 Ekjon Komolalebu (Reincarnation as an Orange: The Story of Jibanananda), Sahaduzzaman

Awards on Jibanananda 
The Kolkata Poetry Confluence in collaboration with Bhasha Samsad has instituted the Jibanananda Das Award for poetry translation. Jibanananda Das awards for translation were given away in ten different languages.

A literary award named Jibanananda Puroshkar, also known as Jibanananda Prize, has been instituted in Bangladesh. It confers annual awards to the best works of poetry and prose by Bangladeshi authors.

Citations

Further reading

Biography 
 Bhattacharya, Bitoshoke (2001), Jibanananda, Banishilpo Publishers, Kolkata.
 Banerjee, Deviprarad (1986), Jibanananda Das – Bikaash Protishthaar Itirbitta (tr: A chronicle of development and achievements of Jibanananda Das), Bharat Book Agency, Calcutta.
 Seely, Clinton B. : 'A Poet Apart' (A comprehensive literary biography of Jibanananda Das), 1990, Associated University Press Ltd, USA
 Ray, Gopal (1971), Jibanananda, Sahitya Sadan, Calcutta.
 Das, Prabhatkumar (2003), Jibanananda Das (2nd edition), Poshchim-bongo Bangla Akademi, Calcutta.
 Dassarma, Pradip (2009), Nil Hawar Samudre: a biographical novel on Jibanananda Das, Pratibhash Publishers, Kolkata

Literary analysis 
 Bose, Ambuj (1965), Ekti Nakshetra Ashe (tr. A star arrives), Mausumi, Calcutta.
 Chowdhury, Faizul Latif (editor) (1994), Jibanananda Das'er "Aat bochor aager ekdin", Dibbyo Prokash, Dhaka.
 Chowdhury, Faizul Latif (editor) (1995), Jibanananda Das'er "Godhuli-shondhi'r Nritto", Dibbyo Prokash, Dhaka.
 Chowdhury, Faizul Latif (editor) (1999), Jibanananda Das'er "Mrityur Aage, Dibbyo Prokash, Dhaka.
 Chowdhury, Faizul Latif (editor) (1999), Jibanananda Bibechona, Anya Prokash, Dhaka.
 Chowdhury, Faizul Latif (editor) (2000), Proshôngo Jibanananda, Dibbyo Prokash, Dhaka.
 Chowdhury, Pranab (editor) (2001), Jibanananda Niye Probôndho (tr: Essays on Jibanananda), Jatiyo Grontho Prokashon, Dhaka
 Das, Prabhatkumar (1999), Jibanananda Das, Poshchim-bongo Bangla Akademi, Kolkata.
 Dutta, Birendra (2005), Jibanananda: Kobi Gôlpokar (tr: Jibanananda: Poet and Short Story Writer), Pustok Biponi, Kolkata .
 Gupta, Dr. Kshetra (2000), Jibanananda: Kobitar Shorir, Shahitto Prokash, Kolkata.
 Mukhopadhyay, Kamal (editor) (1999), Jibanananda Onnikhon, Shilindhro Prokashon, Kolkata
 Roychoudhury, Samir (editor) (2001), Postmodern Bangla Poetry, Haowa#49 Publishers, Kolkata.
 Rudro, Subrata (1985), Probôndhokar Jibanananda (tr: Jibanananda the Essayist), Nath Publishing, Kolkata
 Roychoudhury, Malay (2002), Postmodern Jibanananda, Graffiti Publishers, Kolkata.
 Shahriar, Abu Hasan (editor) (2003), Jibanananda Das: Mullayon o Patthodhhar (tr: Jibanananda Das: Assessment and Critical Readings), Shahitto Bikash, Dhaka
 Syed, Abdul Mannan (editor) and Hasnat, Abul (editor) (2001), Jibanananda Das: Jônmo-shôtobarshik Sharok-grontho, Ôboshôr Prokashona Shôngstha, Dhaka.
 Sinha, Rajib (2014),'Jibananander Andhokaare', Ubudash, Kolkata-12.
 Chowdhury, Faizul Latif (editor) (2022), Jibanananda Patrabali (letters of Jibanananda Das), Pathak Samabesh, Dhaka.

External links 

 
 
 
 
 

1899 births
1954 deaths
Bengali poets
Bengali male poets
Bengali-language writers
Bengali-language poets
Bengali novelists
Brojomohun College alumni
Presidency University, Kolkata alumni
Academic staff of the University of Calcutta
Academic staff of City College, Kolkata
Indian poets
Indian male poets
20th-century Indian poets
20th-century Indian novelists
Indian novelists
Indian male novelists
Indian male writers
20th-century Indian male writers
20th-century Indian writers
Indian essayists
Indian male essayists
20th-century Indian essayists
Indian critics
Indian literary critics
Indian short story writers
Indian male short story writers
20th-century Indian short story writers
Indian non-fiction writers
Indian male non-fiction writers
20th-century Indian non-fiction writers
Indian editors
Indian magazine editors
Indian lecturers
Brahmos
Writers from Kolkata
Modernist poets
Recipients of the Sahitya Akademi Award in Bengali
Novelists from West Bengal
Ramjas College alumni
People from Barisal